The 107th Infantry Memorial is an outdoor bronze sculpture and memorial located at the intersection of East 67th Street and Fifth Avenue in Central Park, in Manhattan, New York, which honors members of the 107th Infantry who died during World War I. Created by the sculptor Karl Morningstar Illava (1896–1954), who "drew from his own experience serving as a sergeant with the 107th," according to the New York City Department of Parks & Recreation, the sculpture cost an estimated $60,000 at the time of its construction, depicts the actions of seven World War I-era soldiers, and rests on a 25-foot-wide stepped granite base designed by architects Rogers & Haneman.

It was donated by the Seventh Regiment New York 107th United States Infantry Memorial Committee, which was headed by C. I. Debevoise, former colonel and commanding officer of the 107th Infantry.

Design and construction
 After deciding to make seven World War I-era soldiers the focus of his sculpture, sculptor Karl Illava worked with foundry experts at the Fond G. Vignali in Florence, Italy to have the figures cast in bronze in 1927. According to the city's parks department website, Illava used his own hands as the model for the hands of his subjects, and staged the "doughboys" in a manner depicting motion, "advancing from the wooded thicket bordering Central Park, as if mounting a charge." The bronze work was then anchored to a plinth on a stepped pedestal of North Jay granite designed by Rogers & Haneman, architects.

The sculpture itself is 9 feet by 11 inches high, 15 feet by 8 inches wide, and 10 feet deep while the pedestal is 7 feet, 7 tall and 32 feet, 8 wide. The inscription on the monument reads: "SEVENTH REGIMENT NEW YORK / ONE HUNDRED AND SEVENTH UNITED STATES INFANTRY / 1917 IN MEMORIAM 1918."

History

Dedication
More than 5,000 people  attended the dedication of the monument on September 29, 1927. The date was chosen to commemorate the 9th anniversary of the Battle of St. Quentin Canal during which the regiment attacked the Hindenburg Line. Speakers included Colonel Hanford MacNider, the Assistant Secretary of War, New York State Senator William T. Byrne, Major General John F. O'Ryan, and General Alexander S. Diven. The sons of two fallen members of the 107th, Captain Clinton E. Fisk of Company D and Captain Fancher Nicoll of Company L., unveiled the monument.

When it was unveiled, many people speculated that the lead soldier was modeled after boxer Gene Tunney, but "[o]fficers of the regiment denied this, saying the sculptor merely had striven to emphasize the characteristic expression of the typical soldier in action" and the sculptor said  the figure was based on advertising executive Paul Cornell.

Remembrance ceremonies
On Armistice Day 1927. the 107th Infantry Post of the American Legion held a religious service and Rev. Peter E. Hoey placed a floral wreath at the memorial to pay tribute to the war dead.

In October 1973, The Commanding officer, Sir Gregor MacGregor of the Scots Guards, held a wreath laying ceremony at the statue to commemorate the units World War I service with the British Army.

See also

 107th Infantry Regiment (United States)
 1927 in art

References

External links

 Central Park, New York: 10 things to do by Rhiannon Edwards (April 2, 2014), The Telegraph

1927 establishments in New York City
1927 sculptures
Bronze sculptures in Central Park
Monuments and memorials in Manhattan
Outdoor sculptures in Manhattan
Sculptures of men in New York City
Statues in New York City